Al Ameen was a Malayalam language was a newspaper founded in 1924 by Mohammed Abdur Rahiman in Calicut, India. It continued its publication until 1939 when it was banned by the Madras government for campaigning in support of India's non-cooperation in World War II. Al Ameen has a very important place in the history of Indian independence movement in Malabar.

History 
Mohammed Abdur Rahiman registered Al-Ameen Company in Calicut in 1923. The first issue of Al Ameen newspaper came out on 12 October 1924, on Prophet Muhammad's birthday. The first issue was published with a message from Vallathol Narayana Menon. The newspaper was started for supporting the Indian independence movement and Khilafat Movement, and to reform Malabar's Muslim community. Abdur Rahiman's statement in Mathrubhumi about Al Ameen reads: "In Al-Ameen, along with the local news and telegraphic messages, there will be various articles borrowed from English, Arabic, Urdu and Tamil newspapers in India and abroad. It will be very helpful to know about the news related to Indian National Congress and Khilafat Movement. The opinions published by Mohammad Ali Jauhar in The Comrade will be carried in Al-Ameen also.

Initially published as a tri-weekly, Al Ameen became a daily in 1930. In the period of activities of the Indian freedom struggle, Al Ameen had taken a harsh and attacking attitude towards the British rule. The Madras government confiscated the Al Ameen'''s press in August 1930. Al Ameen'' resumed publication in November 1930, but soon became a tri-weekly due to financial issues. In March 1939, it started publication as a daily again. It continued publication as a daily until September 1939 when it was banned by the Madras government for campaigning in support of India's non-cooperation in World War II.

References

External links 
 Higher Secondary Course on Journalism

Malayalam-language newspapers
Defunct newspapers published in India
Defunct Malayalam-language newspapers
Newspapers established in 1924
Banned newspapers